Kanamarka or Kanamarca (possibly from Quechua k'ana glowing, K'ana a Peruvian people, marka village) is an archaeological site in Peru. It is located in the Cusco Region, Espinar Province, Alto Pichigua District.

See also 

 List of archaeological sites in Peru

References 

Archaeological sites in Peru
Archaeological sites in Cusco Region